Jurgis Baltrušaitis (May 2, 1873 – January 3, 1944) was a Lithuanian symbolist poet and translator, who wrote his works in Lithuanian and Russian. In addition to his important contributions to Lithuanian literature, he was noted as a political activist and diplomat. Himself one of the foremost exponents of iconology, he was the father of art historian and critic Jurgis Baltrušaitis Jr.

Writer
Baltrušaitis was born to a family of farmers in Paantvardys village near Jurbarkas, which was then under Imperial Russian rule. In 1885, he entered Kaunas gymnasium, and graduated in 1893; he then entered the Faculty of Physical and Mathematical Sciences at Moscow University. At the same time, he attended lectures in the Faculty of History and Philology, and studied foreign languages; Baltrušaitis learned 15 foreign languages during his life.

From 1895 onwards, Baltrušaitis began to take part in editing Moscow-based literary magazines, and he began his own creative work in Russian. He joined the Symbolist movement, and, in association with Sergei Polyakov, set up the publishing house Scorpio, which published the chief Russian Symbolist magazines such as Vesy and Severnyie Tzvety as well as collections of the greatest Russian Symbolist poets. A member of the city's cultural elite, Baltrušaitis was a close friend and colleague of such famous Russian writers and artists as Anton Chekhov, Konstantin Bal'mont, Valery Bryusov, Vyacheslav Ivanov, Maksim Gorky, Konstantin Stanislavsky, Mikhail Vrubel and Aleksandr Scriabin; Boris Pasternak was the private home tutor of Baltrušaitis's children.

Baltrušaitis published three collections of poetry in Russian, and another three in Lithuanian. He authored many Russian translations of modern literature, including ones from Henrik Ibsen, Oscar Wilde, August Strindberg, Knut Hamsun and Gabriele D'Annunzio. His translation of Hunger by Hamsun is considered a classical rendering of this work into Russian, and has been continuously republished right up to contemporary times.

Politician
Between 1900 and 1914, Baltrušaitis lived in Italy and Norway and spent much time traveling in other countries in Western Europe. During World War I and the subsequent Russian Revolution he was in Russia, where he actively participated in the Lithuanian political struggle for independence. In 1919 he was elected President of the Russian Union of Writers, and was known for his efforts to help and rescue many writers and intellectuals during the first years of the Bolshevik regime.

After Lithuania regained independence in 1918, Baltrušaitis was appointed Lithuania's ambassador to Russia in 1920 and held this position until 1939. In 1932 he was honored with a doctorate by Vytautas Magnus University in Kaunas. In 1939, Baltrušaitis was appointed a counselor of the Lithuanian embassy in Paris. Following the annexation of Lithuania by the Soviet Union, his son, Jurgis Baltrušaitis Jr., an art historian and art critic, served as a diplomat for the Lithuanian diplomatic service which continued to represent Lithuanian interests in some Western countries. Baltrušaitis Sr. died in Paris in January 1944; he is buried at Montrouge Cemetery.

See also
Three hares

References
In-line:

General:

 Casimir Norkeliunas: the archival site of the works and scholarship, dedicated to Jurgis Kazimieras Baltrušaitis

External links
 
 Translated poetry of Jurgis Baltrušaitis
 Exhibition of Jurgis Baltrusaitis' furniture at the Lithuanian Art Museum; includes biography

1873 births
1944 deaths
People from Jurbarkas District Municipality
People from Rossiyensky Uyezd
Ambassadors of Lithuania to Russia
Lithuanian art critics
Lithuanian diplomats
Lithuanian male poets
Symbolist poets
Poets from the Russian Empire
Lithuanian translators
Translators to Russian
19th-century poets
19th-century translators
19th-century male writers
20th-century translators
Moscow State University alumni
Imperial Moscow University alumni